Louis-Édouard-Fernand Rinfret  (February 28, 1883 – July 12, 1939) was a Canadian politician.

Biography

He was elected to the House of Commons of Canada for the Montreal riding of St. James in a 1920 by-election. A Liberal, he was re-elected in 1921, 1925, 1930, and 1935. From 1926 to 1930 and again from 1935 to 1939, he was the Secretary of State for Canada.

From 1932 to 1934, he was the mayor of Montreal.

He was brother to Thibaudeau Rinfret, the Chief Justice of Canada, and Charles Rinfret, a prominent Montreal businessman.

Gallery

References

External links

 
 

1883 births
1939 deaths
Liberal Party of Canada MPs
Members of the House of Commons of Canada from Quebec
Members of the King's Privy Council for Canada
Mayors of Montreal
Burials at Notre Dame des Neiges Cemetery